Hilal Musa (born 31 May 1990) is a Palestinian footballer who plays for Shabab Al-Khalil.

Notes

1988 births
Living people
Palestinian footballers
Palestine international footballers
Israeli footballers
Arab-Israeli footballers
Arab citizens of Israel
Hapoel Haifa F.C. players
Hapoel Bnei Tamra F.C. players
Hapoel Rishon LeZion F.C. players
Maccabi Umm al-Fahm F.C. players
Maccabi Ahi Nazareth F.C. players
Bnei Sakhnin F.C. players
Ahli Al-Khaleel players
Shabab Alsamu players
Hapoel Kaukab F.C. players
Shabab Al-Khalil SC players
Liga Leumit players
Israeli Premier League players
West Bank Premier League players
Footballers from Kafr Manda
Footballers at the 2014 Asian Games
Association football midfielders
Asian Games competitors for Israel